Chir (also Romanized as Chīr; also known as Deh-e Āqā Moḩammad Ja‘farkhān and Deh-e Āqā Moḩammad Ja‘farkhān) is a village in Sarvestan Rural District, in the Central District of Bavanat County, Fars Province, Iran. At the 2006 census, its population was 453, in 123 families.

References 

Populated places in Bavanat County